Ramanand Dass was a leader of the Dera Sach Khand, and a follower of Guru Ravidas.

His name came to international attention when he was murdered at the age of 57 in a 24 May 2009 attack on the Guru Ravidass Temple in Austria by Sikh radicals. Rama Nand suffered multiple gunshot wounds and died in the hospital early on 25 May 2009. The attack triggered rioting across much of northern India. He was cremated with full state honors on 4 June 2009, in Dera Sachkhand, India.

References

Ravidassia
Indian murder victims
People murdered in Austria
1952 births
2009 deaths
Victims of Sikh terrorism
2009 murders in Austria